The following is a list of all IFT-licensed over-the-air television stations broadcasting in the Mexican state of Nayarit. There are 14 television stations in Nayarit.

List of television stations

|-

|-

|-

|-

|-

|-

|-

|-

|-

|-

|-

|-

|-

References

Nayarit